Jakomini is the 6th district of  Austrian city of Graz. It is named after Kaspar Andreas Ritter von Jacomini and covers an area of 4,06 square kilometers. With a population of 33,082 in 2016 it is the most populous of the districts of Graz. 
The postal codes of Jakomini are 8010, 8041 and 8042.

Points of interest
 Stadthalle Graz
 Graz University of Technology
 Grazer Herbstmesse
 Jakominiplatz

References 
 

Districts of Graz